TIS S.A. (also known as The Independent Studios and formerly known as Fox Telecolombia and TeleColombia S.A.) is a major Colombian television production company in Spanish, founded in 1995 as the programadora Producciones Bernardo Romero Pereiro. Its president is Samuel Duque Rozo. It changed its name to Telecolombia in 1999. 

In 2007, News Corporation's Fox International Channels bought a 51% share in the company, thus subsequently giving ownership to The Walt Disney Company Latin America after The Walt Disney Company acquired 21st Century Fox on March 20, 2019.

In 2009 Fox produced Mental, the first American TV series produced in Latin America for international markets. The series was filmed at the Fox Telecolombia complex in Bogotá.

As of January 18, 2021, The Walt Disney Company changed the company's name to TeleColombia as part of Disney phasing out the "Fox" brand to avoid confusion with Fox Corporation.

On October 28, 2021, ViacomCBS (now Paramount Global) announced that it is acquiring a majority stake in TeleColombia S.A. from Disney, with the acquisition closed on November 23 of that year.

On October 22, 2022, Paramount Global changed the company's name to TIS along with Estudios TeleMexico being absorbed with the rebrand.

References

External links 
 
Television production companies of Colombia
Former News Corporation subsidiaries

Former subsidiaries of The Walt Disney Company
Paramount Global subsidiaries
Paramount International Networks
2021 mergers and acquisitions